Red eye, red-eye, redeye or variants may refer to:

Related to the eye  
 Red-eye effect, in photographs
 Red eye (medicine), an eye that appears red due to illness or injury
 Red, an extremely rare eye color due to albinism
 Red eyeshine in animals caused by tapetum lucidum

Arts, entertainment and media

Fictional characters
 Red Eye, in video game Last Bronx
 The Red Eye, in The Tick comics

Film, television and radio 
 Red Eye (2005 American film), a  psychological thriller
 Red Eye (2005 South Korean film), a horror film
 Red Eye (talk show), an American TV show
 Red Eye Radio, an American talk radio show

Music 
 Redeye Distribution, an American record label
 Red Eye Records (label), an Australian record label
 Redeye (band), an American rock group
 "Red Eye", a song by Ace Enders from The Secret Wars, 2008
 "Red Eye", a song by Andy Grammer from Magazines or Novels, 2014
 "Red Eye", a song by Big K.R.I.T. from 4eva N a Day, 2012
 "Red Eye", a song by Devo from Duty Now for the Future, 1979
 "Red Eye" (Justin Bieber song), 2021
 "Red Eye", a song by Kid Cudi from Indicud, 2013
 "Red Eye", a song by Styles P from Float, 2013
 "Red-Eye", a song by The Album Leaf from Into the Blue Again, 2006
 "Red Eye" (YoungBoy Never Broke Again song), 2021
 "Red Eyes" (song), by Karan Aujla, 2020
 "Red Eyes", a song by The War on Drugs from Lost in the Dream, 2014

Comics 
 Red Eyes (manga), 2000-present
 Redeye (comics), a comic strip by Gordon Bess

Food and drink 
 Red eye (drink), a coffee drink
 Red eye (cocktail)
 Red-eye gravy, a thin sauce

Places 
 Red Eye Township, Wadena County, Minnesota, U.S.
 Redeye River, Minnesota, U.S.

Other uses
 RedEye, a Chicago newspaper
 common name of the snake Agkistrodon contortrix mokasen 
 common name of the snake Agkistrodon laticinctus
 FIM-43 Redeye, a man-portable surface-to-air missile system
 Red-eye flight, a flight scheduled to depart at night and arrive the next morning
 Paul Chaloner (born 1971), known as ReDeYe or Redeye, esports broadcast host
 Red Eye, a charity founded by Justin Mayo

See also 

 Conjunctivitis, or "pink eye"
 Sauron, a character in J. R. R. Tolkien's The Lord of the Rings